A. Van Jordan (born 1965) is an American poet. He is a professor at Stanford University and was previously a college professor in the Department of English Language & Literature at the University of Michigan and distinguished visiting professor at Ithaca College. He previously served as the first Henry Rutgers Presidential Professor at the Rutgers University-Newark. He is the author of four collections: Rise (2001), M-A-C-N-O-L-I-A (2005), Quantum Lyrics (2007), and The Cineaste (2013). Jordan's awards include a Whiting Writers Award, a Pushcart Prize and a Guggenheim Fellowship.

Early life
Jordan graduated from Wittenberg University in 1987 with a B.A. degree in English Literature. He graduated from Howard University in 1990 with an master's degree in Organizational Communications. He graduated from Warren Wilson College in 1998 with an Master of Fine Arts (MFA) degree, and also holds an additional MFA in Screenwriting (2016) from the Vermont College of Fine Arts. He lived in Washington, D.C., from 1988 to 2002.

Career 
Jordan is the author of four full-length collections. Rise (Tia Chucha Press, 2001) won the PEN Oakland/Josephine Miles Literary Award. M-A-C-N-O-L-I-A (2005), which was listed as one of the Best Books of 2005 by The Times (London); Quantum Lyrics (2007); and The Cineaste (W.W. Norton & Co., 2013). In 2013 he published a chapbook called The Homesteader, and in 2021, he published an ekphrastic chapbook, I Want to See My Skirt, in collaboration with filmmaker Cauleen Smith, based on photographs by Malian photographer Malick Sidibé. Both of his chapbooks were published by Unicorn Press, Greensboro, NC, and edited by Andrew Saulters.

Jordan taught at Warren Wilson College, the University of North Carolina at Greensboro, the University of Texas at Austin, where he was tenured as an Associate Professor, and as professor at the University of Michigan. In 2014, he became Rutgers University-Newark's first Henry Rutgers Presidential Professor, before returning to the University of Michigan in 2017, where he serves as the Robert Hayden Collegiate Professor of English Language & Literature. His academic interests include the writing of poetry, the history of poetry in English, and cinematic studies.

His work has appeared in Ploughshares, and Callaloo, among other publications.

Awards
 2002: Whiting Award
 2005: Anisfield-Wolf Book Awards
 2006: Pushcart Prize XXX
 2007: Guggenheim Fellowship
 2008: United States Artist Williams Fellowship
 2015: Lannan Literary Award in Poetry

Works
"Einstein Defining Special Relativity"; "Einstein Ruminates on Relativity", Reading Between A&B

Poetry
Rise (Tia Chucha Press, 2001)
M-A-C-N-O-L-I-A (W. W. Norton & Company, 2004)
Quantum Lyrics (W. W. Norton & Company, 2007)
The Cineaste (W. W. Norton & Company, 2013)

Essays

Personal life
Jordan is married to Shirley Collado, a professor of psychology and former president of Ithaca College.

References

External links
Interview with A. Van Jordan in Nat Creole Magazine, #8, April 2006
Audio: A. Van Jordan reads "The Structure of Scientific Revolutions" from Quantum Lyrics

1965 births
21st-century American male writers
21st-century American poets
American male poets
Living people
PEN Oakland/Josephine Miles Literary Award winners
Poets from Ohio
University of Michigan faculty
University of North Carolina at Greensboro faculty
University of Texas at Austin faculty
Warren Wilson College alumni
Warren Wilson College faculty
Wittenberg University alumni
Writers from Akron, Ohio